Nationalist Youth of Catalonia (Joventut Nacionalista de Catalunya, JNC) is the youth organisation of Together for Catalonia, founded in 1980 as the youth group of Democratic Convergence of Catalonia (CDC). Alvaro Clapés-Saganyoles Baena is the general secretary since March 2021. It is a full member organization of the European Liberal Youth and the International Federation of Liberal Youth.

History

JNC was founded in April 1980 in Platja d'Aro by young members of CDC, refounded in 2016 as the PDeCAT. The organization gradually evolved to independentist positions, which also influenced the political orientation of CDC.

Presidents and secretary generals

National Executive Committee 2019-2021:

References

External links
 Official website

Secessionist organizations in Europe
1980 establishments in Spain
Catalan nationalism
Youth wings of liberal parties
Youth wings of political parties in Spain